Fernand Leduc (4 July 1916 – 28 January 2014) was a Canadian abstract expressionist painter and a major figure in the Quebec contemporary art scene in the 1940s and 1950s. During his 50-year career, Leduc participated in many expositions in Canada and France. He was born in Viauville, Montreal, Quebec.

Biography
In 1938 Leduc started his studies at the École des Beaux-Arts de Montréal. After graduating in 1943, he left the church and shortly after became a member of the Contemporary Arts Society. Leduc played a major role in forming the group known as the Les Automatistes, co-signing the Refus Global manifesto, but not contributing to the illustrated book. He moved to Paris with his wife Thérèse Renaud in 1946 and slowly distanced himself from the group. There he participated in an exhibition, called Automatisme, at the Galerie du Luxembourg that examined the group. By late 1948, he had distanced himself from them and had joined the Plasticiens. In Paris, Leduc developed a friendship with the painter Jean Bazaine, who was at the time producing works which could be described as abstracted landscapes. This contact was an influence on Leduc's works of the early 1950s.

He returned from Paris in 1953. With Paul-Émile Borduas, the theoretician of the Automatist group, he was the one who maintained the closest ties with the French surrealists. Leduc moved to a type of hard-edge abstraction in 1955. He founded the Non-Figurative Artists' Association of Montréal (Association des artistes non-figuratifs de Montréal) in 1956. He experimented at that time with various forms of spontaneous and gestural nonfigurative painting, his works gradually becoming more involved with interactions and contrast of colours.

Leduc returned to France in 1959 and stayed there until 1970, when he came back for two years to teach in Montréal. In 1970, the Centre culturel canadien in Paris in combination with the National Gallery of Canada held a travelling exhibition of 16 paintings done over a three-year period in which he used biomorphic abstraction. In 1977 he received the Victor Martyn Lynch-Staunton Award. In 1979 he was awarded the Louis-Philippe Hébert Prize and the Paul-Émile Borduas Prize in 1988.

Leduc died of cancer in Montreal on January 28, 2014.

Selected expositions
1950–1951: 
1950: 
1955: 
1956: 
1958: 
1959: 
1961: 
1962: 
1963–1965: 
1966: 
1970	; Mendel Art Gallery, Saskatoon; Memorial University of Newfoundland, Saint-John; Beaverbrook Art Gallery, Fredericton; Université de Sherbrooke; The Robert Mc Laughin Gallery, Oshawa
1972: 
1973: ; Thielson Gallery, London, Ontario; 
1974: 
1980: 
1984: 
1985: 
1986: 
1997: 
2001: 
2011:

Sources
Biographie par la Galerie Michel-Ange
The Canadian Encyclopedia 2000
Galerie Graff bio, expositions
The Automatists and the Book

Suggested reading
 Jean-Pierre Duquette, Fernand Leduc.

References

External links
Composition, 1955

1916 births
2014 deaths
20th-century Canadian painters
Canadian male painters
21st-century Canadian painters
Artists from Montreal
Modern painters
École des beaux-arts de Montréal alumni
20th-century Canadian male artists
21st-century Canadian male artists
Governor General's Award in Visual and Media Arts winners
Canadian abstract artists